One and Eight is a landmark Chinese film from 1983. The film tells the story of eight criminals and a deserting Chinese officer in the communist Eighth Route Army caught in the midst of the Second Sino-Japanese War. Directed by Zhang Junzhao, One and Eight also features cinematography by the soon-to-be-acclaimed Zhang Yimou and stars Chen Daoming. It is based on an epic poem by Guo Xiaochuan.

Significance 
One and Eight constituted an early collaboration between the graduates of the 1982 class  of the Beijing Film Academy, notably classmates Zhang Junzhao and Zhang Yimou. Both Zhang Yimou and Zhang Junzhao were members of the "Fifth Generation", or the first major group of filmmakers to graduate after the end of the Cultural Revolution. As such, One and Eight is often considered one of the first films to move towards the more artistic and experimental mentality that is the hallmark of Chinese cinema of the 1980s.

In particular, the film's focus on humanism and personal conflicts signaled a paradigm shift away from the propagandistic films of the Cultural Revolution.

Notes

External links

One and Eight at the Chinese Movie Database

1983 films
Mandarin-language films
Second Sino-Japanese War films
Chinese war films